Jerks of All Trades (identified on the title card only as “The Three Stooges”) is the title of an American television pilot released on October 12, 1949. It was The Three Stooges' first and only pilot made with Shemp Howard in the role of the third stooge. Filmed before a live studio audience, it was a pilot for a planned TV series on the then-new ABC Television Network. The pilot film is currently in the public domain and is available on home video.

The series never went into production due to objections from Columbia Pictures, who held the trio under contract. To avert a legal hassle, Columbia instead licensed a package of 30 shorts from the film series to ABC.

Plot
The overall concept of the series was that each week The Stooges would try a different job or trade to see if eventually they might succeed; the comedy would ensue as each career they tried would eventually turn into a fiasco. In the pilot they try their hand as interior decorators. In their office, they meet a new client, Mr. Pennyfeather (Emil Sitka). Just a few moments after Pennyfeather arrives, Shemp accidentally spills ink down the front of Pennyfeather's suit, who becomes enraged. The Stooges then challenge Pennyfeather to mischief with them, featuring the famous "Texas" routine. After the some slapstick mayhem, they are successful in tossing Mr. Pennyfeather out of the office. Suddenly, the next client calls him on the phone for them to come in to manage her house. In her house, The Stooges not only hang wallpaper, but also manage to trash their client's home. Unfortunately, that woman is Mrs. Pennyfeather (Symona Boniface in her last on-camera performance before her death) and that house is Mr. Pennyfeather's house. After Mr. Pennyfeather comes home, the Stooges cover Mr. Pennyfeather with wallpaper and both Mr. Pennyfeather and the Stooges recognize each other (after Pennyfeather imitates the "Texas" routine done for him earlier by the Stooges).  In a rage, as the trio attempts to sneak out of the house, both Pennyfeathers attack the boys with their own paint and utensils; the Pennyfeathers also snipe at each other for hiring them.

In the end, Moe, Larry, and Shemp, defeated and severely injured, remove "interior decorators" from the long list of services (listed on their office door) they offer. The list included other comically misspelled potential occupations for the trio for future episodes: physicians, surgeons, lawyers, engineers (civil, aeronautical, electrical and chemical), psychiatrists, optometrists (and "downtown-etrists"), bank examiners, real estate brokers (and broke estate realers), income tax preparers and babysitters (18 and over only).

See also
 The Three Stooges Scrapbook - an early-1960s pilot
 Kook's Tour - a pilot produced in 1969-70

References

External links
 
Jerks of All Trades at ThreeStooges.net

The Three Stooges
Television pilots not picked up as a series
Unaired television pilots